Kurgontepa may refer to:

 Qurghonteppa, a city in Tajikistan
Ķürgontepa, a city in Uzbekistan
Kurgontepa District, a district of Uzbekistan